Kaslinsky District is an administrative and municipal district (raion), one of the twenty-seven in Chelyabinsk Oblast, Russia. It is located in the north of the oblast. Its administrative center is the town of Kasli. Population (excluding the administrative center):  14,955 (2002 Census);

Administrative and municipal status
Within the framework of administrative divisions, it has a status of a town with territorial district—a unit equal in status to administrative districts—the full name of which is The Town of Kasli and Kaslinsky District. As a municipal division, it is incorporated as Kaslinsky Municipal District.

References

Notes

Sources

Districts of Chelyabinsk Oblast
